The winners of the 2017 IndieWire Critics Poll were announced on December 19, 2017.

Winners and nominees

References

Indiewire Critics' Poll
Indiewire Critics' Poll